The Beaver River Bridge (also called "Beaver Valley Bridge") is a bridge that carries the Pennsylvania Turnpike across the Beaver River in North Sewickley Township, Beaver County, Pennsylvania. Built in 1951 and opened in 1952, the -year-old bridge is being redesigned with construction of a new span not expected to begin until 2020 or later. The Beaver River Bridge is an example of a mid-20th century cantilever deck truss with preservation groups making efforts to save it from demolition as its structural style is becoming rare. About 20,000 vehicles travel across the bridge each day.

Replacement 
In 2012, the Pennsylvania Turnpike Commission set aside nearly $300 million to replace the bridge, and began the design phase of its Milepost 12-14 reconstruction project. The project involves widening of the existing turnpike between the two mileposts to support a total of six 12' wide lanes, two 12' wide shoulders, as well as a 26' wide median. To support a wider road, three overhead structures along the turnpike were replaced between 2015 and 2016, and the ramp bridge over Route 18 at the nearby Beaver Valley Interchange was replaced with a temporary bridge. The interchange itself will also be completely reconfigured and the turnpike's mainline bridge over Route 18 will be replaced.

Construction is expected to resume in 2019 to widen the turnpike, replace the bridge, and reconfigure the Beaver Valley Interchange.

See also
 
 
 
 List of crossings of the Beaver River

References

Road bridges in Pennsylvania
Pennsylvania Turnpike Commission
Interstate 76 (Ohio–New Jersey)
Former toll bridges in Pennsylvania
Bridges on the Interstate Highway System
Bridges over the Beaver River (Pennsylvania)
Cantilever bridges in the United States
Bridges in Beaver County, Pennsylvania